Chancellor of Poland ( - , from ) was one of the highest officials in the historic Poland. This office functioned from the early Polish kingdom of the 12th century until the end of the Polish–Lithuanian Commonwealth in 1795. A respective office also existed in the Grand Duchy of Lithuania since the 16th century. Today the office of the chancellor has been replaced by that of the Prime Minister.

Chancellors' powers rose together with the increasing importance of written documents. In the 14th century the office of Chancellor of Kraków evolved into the Chancellor of the Crown and from that period the chancellor powers were greatly increased, as they became responsible for the foreign policy of the entire Kingdom (later, the Commonwealth). The Chancellor was also supposed to ensure the legality of monarch's actions, especially whether or not they could be considered illegal in the context of pacta conventa (an early set of documents containing important laws, in some aspects resembling today's constitutions). Finally, the Chancellor was also responsible for his office, the chancellery. A 16th-century Polish lawyer, Jakub Przybylski, described the Chancellor as the king's hand, eye and ear, translator of his thoughts and will.

From 15th century onward there were two separate Chancellor offices, neither of them subordinate to the other: Great Chancellor and Vice-Chancellor. In the Polish-Lithuanian Commonwealth, there were four Chancellors: Great Chancellor of the Crown, Great Chancellor of Lithuania, Vice-Chancellor of the Crown, and Vice-Chancellor of Lithuania.

History 

During the times of fragmentation of Poland, each Polish prince had his own chancellor, but with the reunification of Poland, the office of Chancellor of Kraków (contemporary capital of the Kingdom of Poland) became dominant and other, local chancellors disappeared by the early 15th century. Also in the 15th century, the Chancellor's office was split into that of the Great Chancellor and Vice-Chancellor. The Vice-Chancellor was, however, not a subordinate of the Chancellor and his independence was specifically confirmed by the laws passed during the reign of king Alexander Jagiellon. The Sejm of 1504 confirmed the Chancellor's office as well as its powers and responsibilities for the first time, specifically stating that one person cannot hold both Chancellors' offices, and established the Grand Lithuanian Chancellor's office. The Lithuanian Vice-Chancellor was created later, in the mid-16th century

After the Union of Lublin in 1569 there were four Chancellors (one Grand Chancellor and one Vice-Chancellor for Crown, and another pair for Lithuania).

At first, the Chancellor's office was always given to an ecclesiastic person. From 1507, Sigismund I the Old decided that the title of Great Crown Chancellor would be rotated between secular and ecclesiastic nobles, and at least one Chancellor (both in the Great and Deputy pair and in the Crown and Lithuanian one after the Union of Lublin) was required to be a secular person.

Power and responsibilities 

Chancellors, as most of the other offices in Poland and later, the Commonwealth, were nominated to the office for life by the King during the Sejm (Parliament) session. From the 15th and 16th centuries, after the reforms of Alexander, Sigismund I and the Union of Lublin, the power and importance of the Chancellor's office was stabilised, as a senatorial office lesser than that of the hetmans (military commanders who had, however, no right to vote in the Senat) and the Grand Marshals, but more important than that of the Grand Treasurers, Court Marshal and others.

By custom, the Greater Chancellor of the Crown directed the Commonwealth foreign policies towards the west – Western Europe and south – Ottoman Empire, while the Greater Chancellor of Lithuania the policies towards the east – Muscovy (later, the Russian Empire).

The Chancellor and Vice-Chancellor (who was not a direct subordinate of the chancellor) were responsible for the work of their chancelleries, respectively Greater and Minor. They were supposed to be in constant contact and develop common policies, since their powers were equal. They were specifically forbidden from issuing illegal and contradictory documents, and could judge any documents contrary to the existing law 'irrelevant and without power'. In theory, the power of the Chancellors were equal. In practice, much depended on their personalities and political influence. Conflicts between Chancellors, while rare, when it occurred, could paralyse the entire country. This was the case during the conflict between Krzesław z Kurozwęk and Maciej Drzewicki between 1501 and 1503.

Among their other responsibilities were the matters of foreign policy (correspondence with other countries) and to a smaller extent, internal affairs, as they had also judiciary powers, presiding over the 'assessors' courts' (Polish: Asesoria), that were the highest appeal courts for people subjected to crown laws (i.e. not subjected to ecclesiastic or magnates courts, but when a chancellor was an ecclesiastic person, he could judge the priests of the king's court). They could judge in various cases, with the exception of when the sides had already reached a compromise or in cases of territorial disputes.

The Chancellors' offices were the Chancelleries (respectively Crown and Lithuanian, Greater and Minor ones). Chancelleries were staffed with officials known as the chancellists (Polish: kancelista): the regent (regent kancelarii), secretaries (sekretarz in Crown)1, writers (pisarz in Lithuania, equivalent to the secretary in Crown), archivists (Polish: archiwista), metricants (Polish: metrykant) and other clerks. The Regent divided the work between the clerks. 2 secretaries (one responsible for private correspondence, the second for official) presented prepared letters to the king for his signature. Writers designed the letters; clerks readied the final drafts. No copies were made, but were instead entered in the archives – books called Metrics (Polish: Metryki), who were taken care of by the two metricans (respectively 2 in Poland and 2 in Lithuania). The Metrican of the Great Chancellor was called the Great Metrican, one serving the Vice-Chancellor was a Minor Metrican. The Chancellery staff had no wages, just like the Chancellors, but in the middle of each reception room was the box into which all clients were supposed to deposit a varying amount of money, and nobody who planned on coming back could afford to be mean. Of much smaller importance were the local, provincial chancelleries, which mostly served as archives for copies of various documents.

Besides their official functions, the royal chancelleries functioned as a kind of semi-official, very prestigious schools. The officials of the chancelleries, who often started their work after their studies, after several years of work, often went forward in the administrative hierarchy, often reaching important posts of bishops or other ecclesiastic or secular offices. Many enlightened chancellors did not restrict the positions in their staff to nobility (szlachta), and often sponsored intelligent applicants from other social classes, not only by hiring them to the chancellery but by paying for their studies at universities in Poland and abroad. Among the most esteemed 'graduates' of chancelleries were Jan Długosz, Martin Kromer and Jan Zamoyski.

The Chancellor often gave speeches representing the royal will. The symbol of their office was the seal, which was used to seal all documents passing through his office. He also sealed documents signed by the monarch and could refuse to seal a document he considered illegal or damaging to the country (such documents had no power without his seal). When the king died, the seal was destroyed during funeral and a new one given to him by the succeeding king. The seal's importance gave a rise to another name for the Chancellor – the sealer (Polish pieczętarz). Due to their important power the Chancellors were considered the guardians of the king and country, making sure a king's folly would not endanger the country by forcing it into an unnecessary war (among the wars prevented by the chancellors was a great crusade against the Ottoman Empire planned by King Władysław IV in the 1630s).

The chancellor's powers combined with the fact that wars required funds which were given by the Senat. The nobles (the szlachta) who controlled the Senate were usually unwilling to increase taxes and levied upon them, which meant that Poland very rarely declared wars on its own. Usually it was attacked by its neighbors, and while it repelled all attacks till the end of the 18th century, it almost never utilised any of its victories. The army was undermanned and under equipped (since usually any suggestion of bigger military budget when enemy was not on the doorstep was labeled as warmongering) and lands of Rzeczpospolita were constantly ravaged by new invasions, crippling its economy.

Other chancellors 

There were many less important chancellors in the country. There was the Chancellor of the Queen. He had much less power than other (King's) Chancellors, he guarded the queen's seal and was the second most important official of her court, after her Court Marshall. He had no right to a seat in the Senate. Even less important were the chancellors of crown princes and princesses, first introduced around the reign of Sigismund I. Then there was the chancellor of the most important of bishops, Primate of Poland, Archbishop of Gniezno. Finally some proud magnates had officials who titled themselves chancellors.

List of chancellors 
 Kanclerz – Chancellor – various local chancellors, until late 14/early 15th century
 Kanclerz krakowski – Chancellor of Kraków – until the 14th century, when he superseded all other Polish local chancellors and transformed into
 Kanclerz koronny – Chancellor of the Crown – from the 14th century until 1569. Sometimes also called Kanclerz Królestwa Polskiego – Chancellor of the Polish Kingdom'
 Kanclerz wielki koronny – Great Chancellor of the Crown – from 1659 until 1795 (end of Commonwealth)
 Kanclerz wielki litewski – Great Chancellor of Lithuania – as above
 Podkanclerzy koronny – Vice-Chancellor of the Crown – as above
 Podkanclerzy litewski – Vice-Chancellor of Lithuania – as above

Great Chancellors of Poland

See also

 Offices in Polish-Lithuanian Commonwealth
 Hetman (Hetmans of the Polish–Lithuanian Commonwealth)
 Chancellor

Notes 
 Secretaries in Crown and writers in Lithuania were often just an honorary title given to people for their service to the state in the areas of administration and such. The normal secretaries should not be confused with the Great Secretaries, who served as Chancellors when the Chancellors were absent, but had no right to vote in the Senat.

References 
 Bielewcz Przemysław, Urzędy Staropolskie last accessed on 21 April 2005

Polish titles
 
Lithuanian titles
 

lt:Kancleris